Kumu Hina is a 2014 American LGBTQ related documentary film co-produced and co-directed by Dean Hamer and Joe Wilson. It is based on the story of Hina Wong-Kalu, and stars Wong-Kalu, Haemaccelo Kalu and Ho'Onani Kamai. The film premiered at the Hawaii International Film Festival on April 10, 2014, and had its television debut on Independent Lens in May 2015.

Synopsis
Hina Wong-Kalu is a māhū - a Native Hawaiian kumu (teacher), activist and cultural icon.  She lives her life "in the middle", in between the traditional ways of Hawaii's indigenous, third gender, māhū culture, and as a modern transgender person in contemporary Hawaii, trying to preserve and pass on the indigenous culture to the younger generations. Māhū were once valued and respected as caretakers, healers, and teachers of ancient traditions who passed on sacred knowledge, but missionaries who arrived imposed their language and religious strictures across the Hawaiian islands, and pushed against this concept.

During the year covered by the film, Kumu Hina mentors one of the students, Hoʻonani, who also finds herself "in the middle" when she wants to join the all-male hula group in her school. The film also follows Kumu Hina's personal life as she seeks a committed romantic relationship with a younger man from Tonga, and travels into the hills to meet her elders, the traditional third gender māhū who live together on the land and provide her with spiritual guidance.

Cast
Haemaccelo Kalu as self
Ho'Onani Kamai as self
Hinaleimoana Wong-Kalu as self

Reception and release
Kumu Hina won the Documentary Jury award at the Frameline Film Festival and the Audience Award as the most popular documentary among voting viewers for the 2014–2015 season of Independent Lens. In 2016, the film won Outstanding Documentary from the GLAAD Media Awards.

Filmmaker magazine called the film "a stunning eye-opener", while Indiewire considered it "incredibly poignant and moving", and YES! magazine commended the film for "lifting the veil on the misunderstood and marginalized experience of 'other' gendered individuals whose identity cannot be defined by the broad strokes of contemporary Western categorization".

Release
The film premiered at the Hawaii International Film Festival on April 10, 2014, and had its television debut on Independent Lens in May 2015.

Education campaign
The filmmakers initiated an education campaign to bring Kumu Hina's message to diverse audiences.  The campaign, launched at an event at the Ford Foundation, includes a short children's version of the film, A Place in the Middle, and teaching and classroom discussion guides.

Accolades

References

External links

Kumu Hina Awards at IMDb

Official website
Interview with Dean Hamer and Joe Wilson at PBS

American documentary films
Transgender-related documentary films
American LGBT-related films
2014 LGBT-related films
2014 documentary films
LGBT Native Hawaiian culture
Films shot in Hawaii
Films set in Hawaii
Transgender in Oceania
Hula
Documentary films about Hawaii
Films set in the Pacific Ocean
2010s American films